Khanate of Maku was an 18th-20th century  khanate based in Maku of the Bayat dynasty.

It came into existence after the death of Nader Shah which led to the breakup of the Safavid empire, and gain semi-independence.  It rejoined the Persian Empire in 1829, however was not abolished for another century after the death of Murtuzaqulu Khan Bayat.

The Khans of Maku 
 Ahmad Khan Bayat
 Hassan Khan Bayat
 Hoseyn Khan Bayat
 Ali Khan Bayat
 Haji Ismaeil Khan Bayat
 Teymur Pasha Khan
 Murtuzaqulu Khan Bayat

References 

 
Maku County
Vassal and tributary states of the Zand dynasty